The 1989 Virginia Slims of Nashville was a women's tennis tournament played on indoor hard courts at the Maryland Farms Racquet Club in Brentwood, Tennessee in the United States and was part of Category 2 tier of the 1989 WTA Tour. It was the fifth edition of the tournament and ran from November 6 through November 12, 1989. Sixth-seeded Leila Meskhi won the singles title.

Finals

Singles
 Leila Meskhi defeated  Helen Kelesi 6–2, 6–3
 It was Meskhi's first singles title of her career.

Doubles
 Manon Bollegraf /  Meredith McGrath defeated  Natalia Medvedeva /  Leila Meskhi 1–6, 7–6(7–5), 7–6(7–4)

References

External links
 ITF tournament edition details
 Tournament draws

Virginia Slims of Nashville
Virginia Slims of Nashville
Virginia Slims of Nashville
Virginia Slims of Nashville
Virginia Slims of Nashville